The 1986 UC Santa Barbara Gauchos football team represented the University of California, Santa Barbara (UCSB) as an independent during the 1986 NCAA Division III football season. Led by first-year head coach Mike Warren, a UCSB alum, the Gauchos compiled a record of 4–5 and were outscored by their opponents 163 to 158 for the season. The team played home games at Harder Stadium in Santa Barbara, California.

This was the first year since the program had disbanded after the 1971 season that UC Santa Barbara participated in football sanctioned by the National Collegiate Athletic Association (NCAA). From 1983 to 1985, a student-run club team competed, but games played by during those years are not considered in NCAA records.

Schedule

References

UC Santa Barbara
UC Santa Barbara Gauchos football seasons
UC Santa Barbara Gauchos football